
Kuridža's Rebellion was a rebellion against the Republic of Venice due to taxation on newly conquered territory, which included a large peasant Orthodox Christian (Serb) population, led by Serbian Orthodox priest Petar Jagodić - "Kuridža" (1666–1749) in Bukovica and Ravni kotari (in the Dalmatian hinterland) that took place in 1704.

The Venetian government implemented a tax of a tenth of yield on all lands that were conquered from the Ottoman Empire with the Great Turkish War (1683–99). With special decrees or investments, lands were assigned to natural and legal persons, with regular payment of an annual tenth collected by tenants. The tenth was introduced in Venetian Dalmatia during the Morean War around 1690.

Serbian Orthodox priest Petar Jagodić organized the poor population in a rebellion against Venetian taxation. Breaking out in Bukovica, it eventually expanded into Ravni kotari. Apart from Kuridža, Žegar chieftain Ilija Nanić and Biograd chieftain Matija Žabetić were also involved. Despite Kuridža's calling to the population of the Knin, Drniš, Skradin and Šibenik areas to rise up, the rebellion did not expand eastwards from the Krka river. The rebels attacked the tax collectors, and also those who did not join the rebellion. Food imports from the Zadar hinterlands to the cities were banned, and money was collected from the people for the needs of further rebellion. Venetian provveditore generale (general-governor) of Dalmatia, Marino Zane, was at the time of the outbreak at Split. He ordered his deputy, the captain of Zadar, to make threats of the most severe punishment and invite the rebels to stop violence and present their problems to the authorities. Responding to the invitation, some 7,000 armed rebels under the leadership of some seventy village chieftains arrived outside Zadar and called the Kotari colonel and count Posedarski, and the serdars Radasović, Smiljanić and Spingaroli to negotiate at Crno. After the talks, Zane received a report from the serdars, after which he sent them back to threaten the rebels with the most severe punishments. The Venetian government had insufficient armed forces in Dalmatia to suppress the rebellion; Zane through calling the rebel chieftains individually and gradually to negotiate in Split, where these were given various promises, won overall chieftains except Kuridža, Nanić and Žabetić, who retreated to Lika. Zane ended his office as governor of Dalmatia in 1705, succeeded by Justinian da Riva. Kuridža, from exile, contacted governor Riva and requested him to hear the exiles. After receiving the three leaders, they were allowed to return home and were left in peace. However, the next governor Vincenzo Vendramino issued for the arrest of Kuridža in 1706 and threw him in jail for the next decades. Nanić and Žabetić were pardoned, most likely due to Venice needing them for future wars with the Ottomans. Kuridža died shortly after his release in old age.

The events are included in the historical novel Most uzdisaja (Bridge of Sighs) by Yugoslav author Mirko Žeželj. A poem dedicated to him is included in Put Morlaka (2013).

See also 
 Janko Mitrović (1613–1659), Morlach leader
 Stojan Janković (1636–1687), Morlach leader
 Ilija Perajica, Morlach leader
 Stanislav Sočivica, Venetian rebel
 Sinobad
 Cvijan Šarić
 Petronije Selaković
 Bajo Pivljanin
 Grujica Žeravica
 Vukosav Puhalović
 Ilija Smiljanić
 Petar Smiljanić
 Vuk Močivuna
 Juraj Vranić
 Tadije Vranić
 Matija Žabetić
 Ilija Nanić

Annotations

References

Sources 

Books
 
 
 
 
 
 
 
 
 
 
 
 
 
 
 
 
 

Journals

External links 
 

1704 in Europe
18th-century military history of Croatia
Conflicts in 1704
Economy of the Republic of Venice
History of the Serbs of Croatia
Peasant revolts
Rebellions against the Republic of Venice
Venetian Dalmatia